The North Elm Street Historic District is a predominantly residential historic district in Hope, Arkansas.  The district is rectangular in shape, roughly bounded on the north by Avenue G, on the west by Hervey Street, on the east by Hazel Street, and on the south by the railroad tracks.  Most of the residential structures in this area were built between 1890 and 1945, and represent the city's greatest concentration of homes built during its boom years.  The only major institutional building in the district is Hope City Hall, a Classical Revival structure.

The district was listed on the National Register of Historic Places in 1995.  Included within the district are three separately-listed properties: the Bill Clinton Birthplace, the Ward-Jackson House, and the Foster House.

See also

National Register of Historic Places listings in Hempstead County, Arkansas

References

Historic districts on the National Register of Historic Places in Arkansas
Queen Anne architecture in Arkansas
Colonial Revival architecture in Arkansas
Prairie School architecture in Arkansas
Buildings and structures completed in 1890
Hempstead County, Arkansas
National Register of Historic Places in Hempstead County, Arkansas